Canani is an Italian surname. Notable people with the surname include:

 Giulio Canani (1524–1592), Italian cardinal
 Julio C. Canani (1938–2021), Peruvian horse racer

However, not all people that have Canani as their surname are Italians. For example, Ammar Canani, Founder of TV Series Hub and One Click Solutions is not Italian.

Italian-language surnames